Anaxilas, also called Anaxilas Comicus, (fl. 340 BC) was a Greek comic poet of the Middle Comedy period. Based on his name, he has been presumed of Doric origin. He was, along with several other Middle Comedy poets (e.g. Antiphanes, Anaxandrides, Amphis, Alexis, Epicrates, Eubulides, Sophilus, and Dionysius of Sinope, all of apparently non-Attic origin) part of the increasing influence of non-Attic poets following the fifth century BC.

He was one of several comic poets mentioned by Diogenes Laërtius, as having "ridiculed" Plato.

Surviving Titles and Fragments
Titles for twenty one of his plays are known, but only fragments of his works remain.

The Rustic Man
Exchange
The Pipe-Player
Botrylion
Glaucus
Manliness
Thrasyleon
Calypso
Circe
Cyclops
Lyremakers (or possibly Perfume-makers)
Cooks
The Recluse
Neottis
Nereus
Bird-Keepers
Wealthy Men (or possibly Wealthy Women)
Hyacinthus, or Hyacinthus the Pimp
Graces
The Goldsmith
Seasons

Notes

References
 Arnold, Sir Edwin, The Poets of Greece, London: Cassell, Petter, and Galpin, 1869.
 Csapo, Eric, Hans Rupprecht Goette, J. Richard Green, Peter Wilson, Greek Theatre in the Fourth Century BC, Walter de Gruyter GmbH & Co KG, 2014.
 Edmonds, The Fragments of "Attic Comedy" After Meineke, Bergk, and Kock: Augm., Newly Ed. with Their Contexts, Annot., and Completely Transl. Into English Verse. Old comedy, Brill Archive, 1959.
 Smith, William; Dictionary of Greek and Roman Biography and Mythology, London (1873). "Anaxilas" .

Ancient Greek dramatists and playwrights
Ancient Greek poets
Middle Comic poets